Thurathadi (also spelled Thuyathadi or Thayéthadi) is a goddess in the Buddhist pantheon of Myanmar. She is one of the higher nats and guarding the Buddhist scriptures and promoting the welfare of scholars and writers. Students in Myanmar pray for her blessings before their exams.  Her origins are said to be derived from the Hindu goddess Saraswati, the consort of Brahma.

Iconography
Thurathadi is represented by riding on the side of the golden Hintha with her legs dangling off the side. She carries one or more Tipitaka books in her right hand.

Origin and legend
According to legend, she is often equated with Saraswati from the Hindu religion. However, Thurathadi has a number of her own stories and has long been worshiped in Myanmar since the Pagan dynasty. In Myanmar, the Shwezigon Mon Inscription near Bagan, dated 1084 AD, recites the name Saraswati as follows:

"The wisdom of eloquence, called Saraswati, shall dwell in the mouth of King Sri Tribhuwanadityadhammaraja at all times." – Translated by Than Tun

According to legend, she will be the mother of both the future king and his bride Mya Sein Yaung. She was also told that she would be reborn as a male and a Buddha. At a Bo Bo Aung shrine near Bagan, the statue of Thuyathadi riding her golden Hintha Bird is found just behind and to the side of the weizza's image. Thuyathadi is a very important nat in Myanmar, ranked and honored as one of the five great devas, and the oldest of all the nats. After the god Thagyamin, she is considered the most important supporter of the religion. Claim for her support of gaing beliefs in weizzas would seem designed to stress the higher Buddhist motivation of the weizzas. Because she guards the Buddhist scriptures—a traditional source of occult lore—and was once in India the goddess Saraswati, who was accredited with inventing Sanskrit, her reputed patronage adds both a Buddhist and scholarly air to weizza affairs.

Gallery

See also
Benzaiten
Nat (spirit)
Mythical creatures in Burmese folklore

References

Burmese nats
Burmese goddesses